This page is a glossary of terms  in string theory, including related areas such as supergravity, supersymmetry, and high energy physics.

Conventions

αβγ

How are these related?
There is only one dimensional constant in string theory, and that is the inverse string tension  with units of area. Sometimes  is therefore replaced by a length . The string tension is mostly defined as the fraction

Tension is energy or work per unit length. Since  has the dimension of action, i.e. momentum times length, it follows that in natural units mass =1/length, and so  has the unit of area.
The slope  of a Regge trajectory  in Regge theory is the derivative of spin  or angular momentum with respect to mass-squared, i.e.

!$@

A

B

C

D

E

F

G

H

I

J

K

L

M

N

O

P

Q

R

S

T

U

V

W

XYZ

See also

List of string theory topics

References

 Becker, Katrin, Becker, Melanie, and John H. Schwarz (2007) String Theory and M-Theory: A Modern Introduction . Cambridge University Press. 
 Binétruy, Pierre (2007) Supersymmetry: Theory, Experiment, and Cosmology. Oxford University Press. .
 Dine, Michael (2007) Supersymmetry and String Theory: Beyond the Standard Model. Cambridge University Press. .

 Michael Green, John H. Schwarz and Edward Witten (1987) Superstring theory. Cambridge University Press. The original textbook.
 Vol. 1: Introduction. .
 Vol. 2: Loop amplitudes, anomalies and phenomenology. .
 Kiritsis, Elias (2007) String Theory in a Nutshell. Princeton University Press. .
 
 Polchinski, Joseph (1998) String Theory. Cambridge University Press.
 Vol. 1: An introduction to the bosonic string. .
 Vol. 2: Superstring theory and beyond. .
 Szabo, Richard J. (Reprinted 2007) An Introduction to String Theory and D-brane Dynamics. Imperial College Press. .
 Zwiebach, Barton (2004) A First Course in String Theory. Cambridge University Press. . Contact author for errata.

External links
Particle physics glossary at interactions.org 

String theory
String theory
String theory
Wikipedia glossaries using description lists